John W. Eber (October 16, 1895 – March 18, 1972) was speaker of the Wisconsin State Assembly.

Biography
Eber was born on October 16, 1895 in Sheboygan, Wisconsin. On April 21, 1921, he married Celia Mitchell. They had one daughter.

Career
Eber was elected to the Assembly in 1922 and re-elected in 1924 and 1926, becoming speaker in 1927. He was a Progressive Republican.

References

Politicians from Sheboygan, Wisconsin
Speakers of the Wisconsin State Assembly
Republican Party members of the Wisconsin State Assembly
1895 births
1972 deaths
20th-century American politicians